Joshua Furst (born 1971) is an American fiction writer. He studied as an undergraduate at New York University's Tisch School of the Arts, receiving a BFA in Dramatic Writing in 1993 and did graduate work at The University of Iowa Writers' Workshop, from which he received an MFA with Honors in 2001.

Joshua Furst's novel The Sabotage Café was named to the 2007 year-end best-of lists of the Chicago Tribune, the Rocky Mountain News and the Philadelphia City Paper, as well as being awarded the 2008 Grub Street Fiction Prize.  He is also the author of the book of stories, Short People.  A frequent contributor to The Jewish Daily Forward, he has also been published in The Chicago Tribune, Conjunctions, PEN America, Five Chapters and The New York Tyrant among many other journals and periodicals and been given citations for notable achievement by The Best American Short Stories and The O’Henry Awards.  He is a founding member of the literary collective Krïstïanïa.

His work has received a 2001-2002 James Michener-Paul Engle Fellowship from the James Michener Foundation/Copernicus Society of America, a Chicago Tribune Nelson Algren Award, and a Walter E. Dakins Fellowship from the Sewanee Writers’ Conference. His plays include Whimper, Myn and The Ellipse and Other Shapes.  They have been produced by numerous theatres, both in the United States and abroad, including PS122, adobe theatre company, Cucaracha Theatre Company, HERE, The Demarco European Art Foundation, and Annex Theatre in Seattle.  He helped organize and run Nada Theatre’s 1995 Obie award winning Faust Festival and was one of the producers of the 1998 New York RAT conference which brought experimental theatre artists from across the United States together for a week of performance and symposia.

Joshua Furst lives in New York City, and teaches at The New School’s Eugene Lang College. and at Columbia University

References

External links
www.JoshFurst.com - Joshua Furst's official website
Interview with Robert Birnbaum, IdentityTheory.com
Interview with Lee Thomas, Fiction Writers Review
Interview with Leonard Lopate, National Public Radio
Soundtrack for The Sabotage Cafe, LargeHeartedBoy.com

American short story writers
American male novelists
Living people
1971 births
21st-century American novelists
Tisch School of the Arts alumni
Iowa Writers' Workshop alumni
American male short story writers
21st-century American male writers